was a general in the Imperial Japanese Army.

Biography
A native of Kagoshima, Hishikari graduated from the 5th class of the Imperial Japanese Army Academy in 1894.

During the First Sino-Japanese War, Hishikari was an officer in the IJA 3rd Infantry Regiment. After the end of the war, he returned to the Army Staff College, graduating from the 16th class in 1902. After graduation, he was appointed commander of the IJA 26th Infantry Regiment.

After serving briefly as Chief of Staff to the Japanese Governor-General of Taiwan, Hishikari became Chief of Staff to the Japanese First Army in the Russo-Japanese War. He later also served during the Siberian Intervention against Bolshevik partisans alongside the White Russian forces in the Russian Maritime Province.

In the interwar period, Hishikari held a number of positions, including Commandant of the Army Academy, commander of the IJA 4th Infantry Regiment, chief of staff of the IJA 2nd Division, and commander of the IJA 23rd Division. He was promoted to major general in July 1918, and lieutenant general in August 1928. He subsequently commanded the IJA 8th Division, IJA 4th Division and the Taiwan Army.  He was promoted to full general in August 1929.

In 1930, Hishikari was assigned to be Commander in Chief of Kwantung Army in Manchuria. He was replaced on 1 August 1931, less than a month before the Mukden Incident.

Following Operation Nekka (the invasion of Northern China), Hishikari was promoted in 1933 to be Commander in Chief of the Kwantung Army for the second time. During his period of command, he administered the agreement reached between Japan and China on 7 August 1933 whereby Japan withdrew China to the north of the Great Wall. He also commanded the continuing operations against the remaining Chinese guerilla forces in the newly established state of Manchukuo, to which Hishikari also held the position of Japanese ambassador.

On 25 September 1933, the Soviet Union protested an alleged plot for Manchukuoan seizure of Chinese Eastern Railway  accusing that it was a carefully worked out plan adopted in Harbin at a series of meetings of the Japanese military mission and the responsible Japanese administrators of Manchukuo.  The Japanese had been offered the railway for sale by the Russians a few months earlier.  On 10 December 1934 Hishikari was replaced by General Jirō Minami.

Hishikari served as a member of the Supreme War Council for 1934–1935, and went into the reserves. He retired completely from military service in April 1941. From 1943 until his death he was the chairman of the All Japan Kendo Association.

References

Books

External links

Notes 

Japanese generals
Japanese colonial governors and administrators
1871 births
1952 deaths
Japanese military personnel of the Russo-Japanese War
Japanese military personnel of World War II
Members of the Kwantung Army
Recipients of the Order of the Golden Kite
Japanese military personnel of the First Sino-Japanese War
People of the Kwantung Leased Territory
Military personnel from Kagoshima Prefecture